Blanket bog or blanket mire, also known as featherbed bog, is an area of peatland, forming where there is a climate of high rainfall and a low level of evapotranspiration, allowing peat to develop not only in wet hollows but over large expanses of undulating ground. The blanketing of the ground with a variable depth of peat gives the habitat type its name. Blanket bogs are found extensively throughout the northern hemisphere - well-studied examples are found in Ireland and Scotland, but vast areas of North American tundra also qualify as blanket bogs. In Europe, the southernmost edge of range of this habitat has been recently mapped in the Cantabrian Mountains, northern Spain, but the current distribution of blanket bogs globally remains unknown.

In the southern hemisphere they are less well-developed due to the relatively low latitudes of the main land areas, though similar environments are reported in Patagonia, the Falkland Islands and New Zealand. It is doubtful whether the extremely impoverished flora of Antarctica is sufficiently well developed to be considered as blanket bogs.

In some areas of Europe, the spread of blanket bogs is traced to deforestation by prehistoric cultures.

Peat harvesting
In many areas peat is used as a fossil fuel either in electricity generation or domestic solid fuel for heating. In the Republic of Ireland a state-owned company, Bord na Móna, owns large areas of bogland and harvests peat for electricity generation.

See also

 String bog

References

Bogs
Bogs of Ireland
Wetlands of Scotland